William Hooper (1742–1790) was an American political leader from North Carolina who signed the United States Declaration of Independence.

William Hooper may also refer to:
William Hooper (Newfoundland politician) (1787–1864), English-born merchant and political figure in Newfoundland
William Northey Hooper (1809–1878), American businessman in the sugar industry
William Hooper (Ohio businessman) (1812–1894), state treasurer of Ohio 1865-1866
William Henry Hooper (1813–1882), delegate from the Territory of Utah
William Hooper (chemist) (1817/8–1877), British chemist
William Hooper (Canadian politician) (1824–after 1873), politician from Prince Edward Island, Canada
William Hulme Hooper (1826–1854), Royal Navy officer
William Harcourt Hooper (1834–1912), British artist, engraver and printmaker
William B. Hooper (1841–1870), Union Army soldier in the American Civil War and Medal of Honor recipient
William Leslie Hooper (1855–1918), acting president of Tufts College, 1912–1914
Bill Hooper (footballer, born 1884) (1884–1952), English footballer
Bill Hooper (English footballer) (1894–1982), English football forward
Bill Hooper (New Zealand footballer) (c. 1900–1964)
William John Hooper (1916–1996), British cartoonist
William Tobe Hooper (1943–2017), American film director, screenwriter, and producer
Jack Hooper (intelligence officer) or William John Hooper (born 1953), former deputy director of the Canadian Security Intelligence Service
William Hooper (missionary), a translator of the Old Testament into Hindi